Pseudopeponidium was a genus of flowering plants in the family Rubiaceae but is no longer recognized. It was sunk into synonymy with Pyrostria.

References

External links 
 World Checklist of Rubiaceae

Historically recognized Rubiaceae genera
Vanguerieae